Peter John Manning (born 17 May 1946) is a former Australian rules footballer who was highly successful in the West Australian National Football League (WANFL) playing for the Swan Districts Football Club. 
Beginning his career in 1944, he was unlucky in missing the dominant period of Swan Districts but did play in the 1965 Grand Final that the Swans lost to East Fremantle.
A skillful and hard running wingman or centreman, Manning played the majority of his career in these positions.  Manning is a life member at Swan Districts and is listed on a half forward flank in their Team of the Century.

References 

1946 births
Living people
Australian rules footballers from Western Australia
Swan Districts Football Club players